Della Vittoria is the 15th quartiere of Rome, Italy, identified by the initials Q. XV. The toponym also indicates the urban zone 17B of Municipio I.

References

External links 
 
 

 
Urban zones of Rome